Alexandra of Schleswig-Holstein-Sonderburg-Glücksburg may refer to:

 Alexandra of Denmark (1844–1925), born Princess Alexandra of Schleswig-Holstein-Sonderburg-Glücksburg, later Queen of the United Kingdom and the British Dominions, Empress of India
 Princess Alexandra Victoria of Schleswig-Holstein-Sonderburg-Glücksburg (1887–1957)